Dombiro, was a Somali historical figure, known for being the wife of the progenitor of the Darod clan, Sheikh Abdulrahman al-Jabarti.

Biography
Dombiro was the daughter of Dagale (Dikalla), the Dir clan chief. While other historical works mention that Dombira was the daughter of Dir. With that Darod established link with the main Samaale Somali's.  

During the 10th or 11th century CE, Dombiro married Sheikh Abdirahman bin Isma'il al-Jabarti (Darod), a son of the Sufi Sheikh Isma'il al-Jabarti of the Qadiriyyah order, who had settled in Somalia just across the Red Sea. The union is said to have given rise to the Darod clan family.

Dombiro is buried just outside the ancient town of Haylaan in the Sanaag region of Somalia, where Sheikh Darod's tomb is located.

See also
Sheikh Ishaaq

Notes

External links
Dōmbira daughter of Dagāle

10th-century Somali people
Ethnic Somali people
10th-century women